The Organizer is the fourth album Lester Bowie recorded for the Japanese DIW label and the first album by his "New York Organ Ensemble". It was released in 1991 and features performances by Bowie, Steve Turre, Amina Claudine Myers James Carter, Phillip Wilson and Famoudou Don Moye.

Reception
The Allmusic review by Al Campbell awarded the album 3 stars stating "In 1991, while on hiatus from the Art Ensemble of Chicago and Lester Bowie's Brass Fantasy, the trumpeter revisited his organ roots. He wisely matched the soulful, gospel influences of organist Amina Claudine Myers and the exhilarating tenor powerhouse James Carter with trombonist Steve Turre and drummers (fellow AEC members past and present) Famoudou Don Moye and Phillip Wilson, making for invigorating yet reverent sessions".

Track listing
 "Sonala Nobala" (Turre) - 5:43  
 "Angel Eyes" (Brent, Dennis) - 11:21  
 "The Burglar" - 9:55  
 "Guten Morgen Part 2" (Myers) - 5:27  
 "Ready Joe" - 8:04  
 "Brooklyn Works Suite" - 8:43  
All compositions by Lester Bowie except as indicated
Recorded at Systems Two, Brooklyn, NY on 14, 15 & 16 January 1991

Personnel
Lester Bowie: trumpet, flugelhorn
Steve Turre: trombone 
Amina Claudine Myers: organ, vocals 
James Carter: tenor saxophone 
Famoudou Don Moye: drums (tracks: 1, 3 & 5), percussion (tracks: 2, 4 & 6) 
Phillip Wilson: drums (tracks: 2, 4 & 6)

References

1991 albums
DIW Records albums
Lester Bowie albums